Brădeanca may refer to several villages in Romania:

 Brădeanca, a village in Jirlău Commune, Brăila County
 Brădeanca, a village in Vernești Commune, Buzău County

See also 
 Brădet (disambiguation)
 Brădetu (disambiguation)
 Brădești (disambiguation)
 Brădățel (disambiguation)